See Lazcano (disambiguation) (a variant form) for people with this surname.

Lazkao  is a town and municipality located in the Goierri region of the province of Gipuzkoa, in the Basque Country.

Location
Lazkao is located in  the Southern Basque Country, in the province of Gipuzkoa, Spain. Lazkao lies in a lush valley. To its north are Beasain and Ordizia; to the south are Idiazabal and Ataun; to the east Zaldibia and to the west Olaberria.

Distances to important places

Donostia-San Sebastián: 45 km
Madrid: 428 km
Barcelona: 507 km

Transport
Nearest train station: In Beasain to 2 km
Communicated with roads to these towns: Olaberria, Ataun, Ordizia, Beasain.
Bus stations through all the town with these lines:
Ataun-Lazkao-Beasain
Ataun-Lazkao-Ordizia-Zaldibia
San Sebastián-Logroño
San Sebastián-Pamplona
Airports:
Airport of Hondarribia (Donostia-San Sebastián): 58 km
Airport of Loiu (Bilbao): 86 km
Airport of Noain (Pamplona/Iruñea): 68 km
Airport of Foronda (Vitoria-Gasteiz): 83 km

Town Council
Town Council
Mayor: Kepa Zubiarrain (EAJ-PNV)
Municipal Police
The municipal police force in Lazkao (in Basque Udaltzaingoa), has four policemen, two police cars and a motorbike.
The police station is located in the ground floor of the town hall of Lazkao. The municipal police of Lazkao carries out these duties: Traffic, notifications, works control, organization of the town market, lost objects, etc.

History
Many Basque historians think that Lazkao was founded in 1053.

1936-1939
Two men were shot in Lazkao during the Spanish Civil War.

ETA
The future leader of ETA, Eustakio Mendizabal, studied at the Benedictine monastery in Lazkao from 1954 to 1966.

In 2005, a Benedictine monk of the town was arrested by the Spanish National Police and by the Guardia Civil. They thought that the monk had connections with the Basque separatist group ETA.
In 2006, ETA detonated a bomb in the company Azkar, because Azkar did not pay the revolutionary tax to the group.

Religion
2007 was the Second anniversary of bicentenary of the arrival of the Benedictine monks to the town. Celebrated by the Deputy-General of Gipuzkoa and by Juan Jose Ibarretxe, the Lehendakari (Basque Prime Minister) of the Basque Autonomous Community.

Festivals
Day of the Donkey
Every first Sunday in January. On this day, the Flight to Egypt is performed throughout the street of the town.

This Biblical passage was first performed in Lazkao the 17th century. Nowadays, the Nuns of the Covent of Lazkao continue to sell the traditional wafers for this event.

Famous people
Cyclist Joseba Beloki Runner-up in the 2002 Tour de France (and placed third the previous year).
Lazkao Txiki (Joxe Migel Iztueta Kortajarena), a noted bertsolari.

References

External links

 Official Website of the City Council 
 LAZKAO in the Bernardo Estornés Lasa - Auñamendi Encyclopedia (Euskomedia Fundazioa) 
 Maizpide Euskaltegia - Barnetegia, Lazkao (a school teaching the Basque language to adults)

Municipalities in Gipuzkoa